Hoffman High School was a secondary school located in Hoffman, Minnesota.  Their mascot was the Bearcat.  

In 1978, Hoffman won the Minnesota State 9-Man Football Championship in Foley, Minnesota.  Standout players for the Bearcats included; Steve Olson, Mike Ziemer, Joel Thorstad, Mike Gunderson, Mark Gunderson, Dave Parks, Dan Cleland. (Hist of Hoffman)

Hoffman High School paired with Kensington in the fall of 1979 to form, Hoffman-Kensington High School which later closed. Local students now attend West Central Area Schools in Barrett.

Education in Grant County, Minnesota
Educational institutions disestablished in 1979
Defunct schools in Minnesota